Tangled Web may refer to:

 "Oh, what a tangled web we weave/When first we practise to deceive!", a line from Marmion, an epic poem by Walter Scott
 A Tangled Web (Montgomery novel), a 1931 novel by L. M. Montgomery
 A Tangled Web (Blake novel), a 1956 novel by Cecil Day-Lewis, written under the pen name of Nicholas Blake
 "The Tangled Web", an episode of Yes, Prime Minister
 "Tangled Web" (Xiaolin Showdown), an episode of Xiaolin Showdown
 Spider-Man's Tangled Web, a 2001–2003 comic book series
Tangled Webs, a novel by Elaine Cunningham
Operation Tangled Web, a raid conducted in 2007 by the U.S. Immigration and Customs Enforcement